Spark Masayuki Matsunaga (October 8, 1916April 15, 1990) was an American politician and attorney who served as United States Senator for Hawaii from 1977 until his death in 1990. Matsunaga also represented Hawaii in the U.S. House of Representatives and served in the Hawaii territorial house of representatives. A member of the Democratic Party, Matsunaga introduced legislation that led to the creation of the United States Institute of Peace and to reparations to Japanese-American World War II detainees.

Early life
Born Masayuki Matsunaga on October 8, 1916 the Territory of Hawaii island of Kauai, Spark Matsunaga was Japanese-American. His parents had emigrated to the United States from Japan. When he was eight, he was nicknamed Sparky after Spark Plug, a character in the comic strip Barney Google and Snuffy Smith. He received a bachelor's degree with honors in education from the University of Hawaiʻi in 1941.

Following the Japanese attack on Pearl Harbor, Matsunaga — despite being a second lieutenant in the U.S. Army — was placed in a detention camp in Wisconsin. He and other incarcerated Japanese-Americans obtained permission from President Franklin D. Roosevelt to form the 100th Infantry Battalion. Matsunaga was twice wounded in battle in Italy during World War II. He served with the renowned 442nd Regimental Combat Team and was released from the Army as a Captain. Matsunaga graduated from Harvard Law School in 1951.

Political career
Matsunaga served as a prosecutor and was a member of the Hawaii territorial House of Representatives.

After Daniel Inouye was elected to the Senate, Matsunaga succeeded him as the state's sole member of the House of Representatives. That year, with Hiram Fong retiring, Matsunaga defeated Hawaii's other House representative, Patsy Mink, for the Democratic Party nomination for Senator. Matsunaga then defeated former Republican governor William Quinn in the general election and went on to serve in the United States Senate from 1977 until his death in 1990.

In 1984, following many years of effort from Matsunaga, Congress passed a bill creating the U.S. Institute for Peace.

For 22 years, Matsunaga presented legislation in Congress for the creation of the position of United States Poet Laureate.  In 1985, a bill was finally passed authorizing the position of Poet Laureate Consultant in Poetry to the Library of Congress.

Matsunaga was instrumental in the passage of a redress bill for people of Japanese descent who were detained in the United States during World War II. The $1.25 billion bill provided $20,000 to each detainee and also apologized to the detainees.

Matsunaga was known for his sense of humor. One famous incident involved Matsunaga and then-Secretary of State Alexander Haig at a White House reception for Japanese Prime Minister Zenko Suzuki in 1981. Haig reportedly mistook Matsunaga for a member of the Japanese delegation and asked if he spoke English. Matsunaga replied, "Yes, Mr. Secretary, I do — and I had the honor of voting for your confirmation the other day."

Personal life and death
Matsunaga was married to the former Helene Hatsumi Tokunaga and had three daughters and two sons.

Matsunaga went to Toronto General Hospital for treatment and died in Toronto on April 15, 1990 at the age of 73 from prostate and bone cancer. His flag-draped casket lay in state in the rotunda of the State Capitol in Honolulu.

Legacy
In 1997, Matsunaga's widow donated his papers to the University of Hawaiʻi at Mānoa. There were approximately 1200 boxes of material including documents, photographs, videos, and memorabilia from his 28 years in Congress. Also in the papers are professional and personal materials from his pre-Congressional life; especially noteworthy are documents, letters, photographs, and memorabilia from his Army service in the 100th Infantry Battalion.

A bronze statue honoring him is in the Spark M. Matsunaga International Children's Garden For Peace at the Storybook Theatre of Hawaii in his hometown of Hanapepe, Kauai. Matsunaga's portrait currently appears on US Series I Bonds in the $10,000 denomination. There is also an elementary school in Germantown, Maryland and a hospital in Honolulu named after him.

See also
List of Asian Americans and Pacific Islands Americans in the United States Congress
List of United States Congress members who died in office (1950–99)

References

External links

Spark M. Matsunaga biography United States Institute of Peace.
Spark M. Matsunaga's published biography Sparky: Warrior, Peacemaker, Poet, Patriot by Richard Halloran. .

Biography on U.S. Congress House website

|-

|-

|-

1916 births
1990 deaths
20th-century American politicians
United States Army personnel of World War II
American military personnel of Japanese descent
American politicians of Japanese descent
Democratic Party members of the United States House of Representatives from Hawaii
Democratic Party United States senators from Hawaii
Harvard Law School alumni
Hawaii politicians of Japanese descent
Members of the Hawaii Territorial Legislature
Members of the United States Congress of Japanese descent
Asian-American members of the United States House of Representatives
Asian-American United States senators
Military personnel from Hawaii
People from Kauai County, Hawaii
United States Army officers
Deaths from prostate cancer
Deaths from bone cancer
Burials in the National Memorial Cemetery of the Pacific
United States Army reservists
University of Hawaiʻi at Mānoa alumni